Taylor McVeity (February 20, 1857, Richmond, Ontario – March 21, 1951) was elected mayor of Ottawa in 1914.

McVeity studied law, was called to the bar in 1882 and opened an office in Ottawa. After his term as mayor, he later moved to Windsor, Ontario.

References

1857 births
1951 deaths
Mayors of Ottawa
Lawyers in Ontario